De Gennes may refer to:

People

 Charles Dubois de Gennes (1814–1876), French writer, journalist and chansonnier
 Jean-Baptiste de Gennes (c. 1656 – 1795), French naval officer, governor of Saint-Christophe
 Jean Dubois de Gennes (1895–1929), World War I flying ace 
 Pierre-Gilles de Gennes (1932–2007), French physicist and Nobel Prize winner

Other

 De Gennes Prize, awarded biennially by the Royal Society of Chemistry

See also
 Gennes (disambiguation)